3,5-Dihydroxybenzoic acid (α-resorcylic acid) is a dihydroxybenzoic acid. It is a colorless solid.

Preparation and occurrence
It is prepared by disulfonation of benzoic acid followed by hydrolysis of the disulfonate.

It is a metabolite of alkylresorcinols, first identified in human urine and can be quantified in urine and plasma, and may be an alternative, equivalent biomarker of whole grain wheat intake.

References 

Dihydroxybenzoic acids
Phenolic human metabolites